Ebrima Jatta (born 10 January 2002) is a Gambian footballer who plays as a midfielder or attacker for Ittihad Kalba.

Career

In 2021, Jatta signed for Armenian side Sevan. Before the second half of 2021–22, he signed for Ittihad Kalba in the United Arab Emirates. On 25 March 2022, he debuted for Al Ittihad (Kalba) during a 1-0 win over Ajman.

References

External links

 

2002 births
Al-Ittihad Kalba SC players
Armenian Premier League players
Association football forwards
Association football midfielders
Expatriate footballers in Armenia
Expatriate footballers in the United Arab Emirates
Gambian expatriate footballers
Gambian footballers
GFA League First Division players
Living people
Real de Banjul FC players
Sevan FC players
UAE Pro League players